Blackbeck Tarn is a small tarn in Cumbria, England, situated near the summit of Haystacks in the Buttermere Valley.

References

Lakes of the Lake District
Buttermere, Cumbria (village)